Justice Irshad Hasan Khan (Urdu) (born 7 January 1937) was Chief Justice of the Supreme Court of Pakistan from 26 January 2000 to 6 January 2002. 
He took his oath under PCO (Provisional Constitutional Order) which was promulgated by General Pervez Musharraf following a military takeover in Pakistan. Subsequently, it was Mr Irshad who violated his oath of office by illegally validating the military takeover by invoking the doctrine of necessity in his supreme court ruling of 12 May 2000.

He is a law graduate from the University of Punjab. Khan enrolled as a pleader in 1959, and as an advocate, High Court of West Pakistan in 1961. He worked on the Supreme Court of Pakistan in 1966, and signed the rolls of Senior Advocate to the Supreme Court in 1979. He was a visiting professor at Himayat-e-Islam Law College from 1975 to 1979. He served as Deputy Attorney General for Pakistan from 1979 to 1981. After his retirement from the Supreme Court on 6 January 2002, he was appointed Chief Election Commissioner.

References

External links
Profile at Law and Justice Commission of Pakistan

1937 births
Chief justices of Pakistan
Living people
Pakistani judges
University of the Punjab alumni
People from Lahore